Patrik Pavlenda (born 3 May 1982) is a Slovak footballer who currently plays for Union Gschwandt.

Career
He joined to Górnik Zabrze in the winter-break 2007/2008 season from FC ViOn Zlaté Moravce. Pavlenda played one year for Górnik Zabrze in twelve matches and on 28 January 2010 moved back to his homeclub FC ViOn Zlaté Moravce.

Honors
 Slovak Cup in 2007 with FC ViOn Zlaté Moravce

References 

1982 births
Living people
Sportspeople from Malacky
Slovak footballers
Górnik Zabrze players
FC ViOn Zlaté Moravce players
FC Nitra players
Slovak Super Liga players
Expatriate footballers in Poland
Slovak expatriate sportspeople in Poland
Association football defenders
Slovak expatriate footballers